Hello Sailor is the debut album released in 1977 by New Zealand band, Hello Sailor.

Track listing

Credits
 Artwork – Peter Adams
 Bass – Lisle Kinney
 Drums – Ricky Ball
 Engineer – Ian Morris
 Producer – Rob Aicken
 Vocals, Guitar – Dave McArtney, Harry Lyon
 Vocals, Saxophone, Harmonica, Acoustic Guitar – Graham Brazier

Charts

Awards

References

Hello Sailor (band) albums
1977 debut albums